The bananal antbird (Cercomacra ferdinandi) is a species of bird in the family Thamnophilidae. It is endemic to the wetlands of the central Araguaia river in Brazil, and has one of the smallest ranges of any Amazon bird.

Habitat
Its natural habitat is the igapó flooded forest, where it hunts for insects and invertebrates in the understory. It is most abundant in the Cantão wetlands, which form the largest flooded forest of the southeastern Amazon.

References

External links
BirdLife Species Factsheet.

Cercomacra
Birds of the Cerrado
Endemic birds of Brazil
Birds described in 1928
Taxa named by Emilie Snethlage
Taxonomy articles created by Polbot